The Plumb Brook flows into the Grass River in Russell, New York.

References 

Rivers of St. Lawrence County, New York